Hernando (de) Alvarado Tezozómoc was a colonial Nahua noble. He was a son of Diego de Alvarado Huanitzin (governor of Tenochtitlan) and Francisca de Moctezuma (a daughter of Moctezuma II). Tezozómoc worked as an interpreter for the Real Audiencia. Today he is known for the Crónica Mexicayotl, a Nahuatl history.

Ancestry

Importance

Fernando de Alvarado Tezozómoc was also a chronicler of some note, pertaining to a group of mestizo chroniclers with Fernando de Alva Cortés Ixtlilxóchitl, Diego Muñoz Camargo and Chimalpahin.

Notes 
 A keeper of “The Black ink”
A learned Nahua.
A noble man, descendant of the ruling class. A member of the Calmecac.

References

Bibliography 

Aztec nobility
Aztec scholars
Historians of Mesoamerica
Interpreters
Nahuatl-language writers
Novohispanic Mesoamericanists
16th-century Mesoamericanists
16th-century Mexican historians
16th-century indigenous people of the Americas
16th-century births
Year of birth missing
Year of death missing

Nahua nobility